Udea indistinctalis is a moth in the family Crambidae. It was described by William Warren in 1892. It is found in North America, where it has been recorded from Alberta, Saskatchewan, Washington and California.

The wingspan is about 26 mm. The forewings are pale grey, tinged with fawn colour and sparsely dusted with blackish dots. The lines and stigmata are indistinctly darker, the latter edged with black dots. The exterior line is thick and bluntly denticulate (tooth like). The central area of the wing is slightly paler than the rest and there is a row of small dark dots before the base of the fringes which have a darker medial line. The hindwings are dark ochreous, dusted with grey and with an indistinct dark discal spot and a submarginal line, beyond which the rest of the wing is darker. Adults have been recorded on wing from June to July and from September and October.

Subspecies
Udea indistinctalis indistinctalis
Udea indistinctalis johnstoni Munroe, 1966 (Washington)

References

Moths described in 1892
indistinctalis